Akers is a surname. Notable people with the surname include:

Alan Burt Akers, penname of Kenneth Bulmer
Bill Akers, Major League Baseball infielder
Cam Akers (born 1999), American football player
Charles W. Akers, historian and educator
Courtney Akers, British actress
Dave Akers, videogame designer
David Akers, American football placekicker
Deborah Akers, author and researcher
Fred Akers (1938–2020), former American football coach
Garfield Akers, blues singer and guitarist
George Akers, film editor
Jeran Akers, former mayor of Plano, Texas
John Fellows Akers, president of IBM
Karen Akers, American actress and singer
Landen Akers (born 1997), American football player
Mary Ann Akers, political gossip columnist
Michael Akers, American film director, producer, screenwriter and editor
Michelle Akers, American soccer player
Polk E. Akers, inventor of Akers' clasp
Rob Akers, architect
Ronald Akers, American criminologist
Susan Grey Akers (1889–1984), American librarian
Thomas Akers, former United States astronaut
Vic Akers, former football player and manager
Wallace Akers, chemist and industrialist